Philippines and the Spratly Islands – this article discusses the policies, activities and history of the Republic of the Philippines in the Spratly Islands from the Philippine perspective. Non-Philippine viewpoints regarding Philippine occupation of several islands are currently not included in this article.

This article often uses the Philippine names of the maritime features, rather than the international names.

Overview

The Philippines, along with Vietnam, the People's Republic of China (PRC), the Republic of China (ROC), Malaysia and Brunei, is a claimant country in the disputed Spratly Islands of the South China Sea.

, the Philippines are occupying and/or controlling eleven features (eight islands, three reefs), as detailed in the following table:

By comparison, within the Spratly Islands:
 Vietnam occupies and/or controls six islands, seventeen reefs and three banks,
 ROC occupies and/or controls one island and one reef, 
 Malaysia occupies and/or controls one artificial island and five reefs, and
 PRC occupies and/or controls eight reefs.

Also, the Philippines has some features that are "virtually occupied". These are features that lie in very close proximity to Philippine-occupied features, and can be seen within the horizon. These include: North Reef, Sandy Cay, Loaita Nan and Loaita Cay.

Also, most features that lie to the east of the 116°E Meridian of longitude, though not necessarily occupied, are largely controlled by the Philippines.

Unoccupied features

{| class="wikitable"
|+Not occupied by any country
|colspan="4"|These are unoccupied features which have been given Philippine names. Some sources say that some of these features are occupied by Vietnam or China, but most sources say that they are not occupied. "Occupation" is possibly confused because the said reefs are very close to other occupied features. There are many unoccupied features in the Spratly chain. The current Code of Conduct prohibits any country from acquiring new features. Many of these features are actually in between and/or near two or more occupied features of different countries. Thus, they serve like buffer zones. 
|-
!Int'l Name      
! Philippine Name   
!Description
|-
| Alicia Annie Reef || Arellano || A sand "cay", 1.2 m high. Many rocks above high tide line. Reef encloses a lagoon.
|-
| Discovery Small Reef || Burgos Reef || Above water only at low tide.
|-
| Hopps Reef || Diego Silang || Above water only at low tide. Part of Southampton Reefs.|-
| Livock Reef || (NE part) Jacinto(SW part) Bonifacio || Above water only at low tide. Some rocks still visible at high tide. Part of Southampton Reefs.|-
| Menzies Reef || Rajah Lakandula || Awash at low tide. Part of Loaita Bank.|}

History

Municipality of Kalayaan

He "found" the islands while he, with his brothers and 40 crew, were "adventuring" in the South China Sea. Observing that there was no human settlement, nor national flag, present on them, he decided to establish the Kalayaan municipality. He posted a document in English, entitled Notice to the Whole World, on all features he claimed. His claim comprises about fifty features among the Spratly group.  In September 1956, after the Republic of China occupied the largest island, Ligao Island (Itu Aba), Cloma decided to cede and sell all the territories of his state to the Philippines for one peso (US$0.50 of the time). Cloma wrote to Carlos Garcia, then Philippine Vice President and Foreign Minister, asserting that his claim was based on "discovery and occupation". Garcia replied that judging from the point of "occupation" and "proximity", there were no reasons for these islands and reefs not to be under Philippine jurisdiction.

The Philippine government incorporated the Kalayaan group into Palawan Province as a municipality in April 1972, and claimed in 1974 that "Its location rendered it strategically important to Philippine national security". In 1978, the Philippine Presidential Decree No. 1599 was based on the fact that Kalayaan is within the Philippine 200-mile exclusive economic zone (EEZ). The Philippine claim extends over an area of 70,150 sq. nm.

Philippine occupation
The Philippines sent troops to the Spratly group for the first time in 1968. It prioritized large islands such as Pagasa (Thitu Island), Likas (West York Island),  Parola (Northeast Cay), Kota (Loaita Island, Lawak (Nanshan Island), and Pugad (Southwest Cay). Two small islands, Patag (Flat Island) and Panata (Lankiam Cay), were also occupied.

To further the claim of the Philippines on the island group, the late President Ferdinand Marcos, on June 11, 1978, formally annexed the Kalayaan Islands by virtue of Presidential Decree No.1596.

Several years after the Philippines had occupied its latest island, it became apparent that Vietnam was not content in only occupying islands; Vietnam started occupying many reefs. By 2008, Vietnam had about 30 non-island occupied features. Some of these are very close to Philippine-occupied islands. Due to the pressure of losing fishing area in South China Sea, the Philippines decided to occupy at least two reefs: Rizal (Commodore Reef) and Balagtas (Irving Reef). Rizal is not in the northeast region; it is near many Vietnamese and Malaysian occupied reefs, thus serving as a good sentry against eastward expansion of Vietnam and northward expansion of Malaysia (see the map below). Unlike Rizal, Balagtas lies at the center of the northeast region.

Southwest Cay invasion

Southwest Cay, also known in the Philippines as Pugad Island; ; Mandarin , is an island in the North Danger Reef of the Spratly Islands. It was occupied by Philippine forces up to 1975, when South Vietnam forces were able to invade and occupy the island.

Southwest Cay is in the northern western corner of the Spratly Islands. It is within the North Danger Reef, which also contains the Philippine-occupied Northeast Cay (Parola Island), the Vietnamese-occupied South Reef and the unoccupied North Reef. Southwest and Northeast Cays are just  from each other; each island can actually see the other within their respective horizons.

The "invasion" (occupation of the island) took place when all of the Philippine soldiers guarding the island of Pugad (Southwest Cay) left to attend to the birthday party of their commanding officer, who was based on the neighbouring Parola Island (Northeast Cay). The storm that day is also believed to have persuaded all of the soldiers to regroup temporarily on Parola island. A report also came out saying that South Vietnamese officials managed to send Vietnamese prostitutes to the birthday party to lure the Filipino soldiers guarding Pugad Island. The "gift" was said to be a "present" to the Philippine commander for his birthday, and as a move by South Vietnamese forces to befriend all Filipino soldiers guarding the Spratlys. Philippine soldiers did not expect that South Vietnam would resort to foul play since both the Philippines and South Vietnam, together with the United States, were allies in the Vietnam War. This tactic is believed to be the reason why South Vietnamese forces knew that the Filipino soldiers had left the island, an action that would usually be kept confidential.

After the party, and when the weather cleared, the returning soldiers were surprised to find that there was a company of South Vietnamese soldiers on the island. The South Vietnamese flag had replaced the Philippine flag flying on the pole erected by the Philippine soldiers. They returned to Parola immediately for fear that Parola would be the next target. After higher-ups of the Philippines were informed about the situation, they instructed the troops based in Parola and Pagasa to stay on red alert status. The following morning, the only thing the Filipino soldiers could do on Parola was to "curse" while the South Vietnamese soldiers sang their national anthem. Philippine Malacañang officials, who did not want to compromise the alliance while the Vietnam War was still being fought, decided to remain silent.

A few months later, the then recently formed unified Vietnam (after North Vietnam successfully invaded South Vietnam) decided to launch a campaign to remove all remaining South Vietnamese troops in the Spratlys and establish military control among the features. It was reported that dozens of South Vietnamese soldiers on Pugad Island swam all the way to Parola just to avoid being captured by North Vietnamese forces. It was then when Malacañang officials, headed by President Ferdinand Marcos, discussed how the Philippines could reclaim the island. It had been apparent that most of the officials (who treated the Vietnamese communists as a threat to the Philippine national security) wanted to attack Pugad to reclaim it. However, after an intelligence report stated that the unified Vietnam had already built a huge concrete garrison within a few weeks, the officials dropped the plan and tried to resolve the issue diplomatically. This approach eventually died, and Pugad was still a Vietnamese-occupied island . This incident was reported in interviews with soldiers involved in an episode of the now defunct Magandang Gabi Bayan TV program. (Eng.: Good Evening Nation) (MGB) of ABS-CBN.

Expansion of other claimants
By the end of the 1970s, the Philippines had occupied a total of eight islands and two reefs. These features, excluding Southwest Cay, are still occupied by the Philippines today. The Philippines has never occupied another feature after the 1970s until 1999. While other countries occupied most of the features they control now during that period, the Philippines has maintained not to occupy any features further. It is attributed to the Philippines' initiation for the cooperative development of the area. The Philippines, Vietnam and Malaysia, along with other ASEAN countries who can serve as investors, were already drawing a plan on a wide exploitation of the Spratly group in the early 1980s when suddenly China became interested in the area. China began occupying features by mid-1980s causing the ASEAN plan to halt. The most controversial occupation of China is the Panganiban Reef (Mischief Reef) in 1995 (See Mischief Reef for further discussion).

In 1999, Malaysia occupied Gabriela Silang Reef (Erica Reef) and Pawikan Reef (Investigator Shoal), causing the Philippines to protest further. No structure is built on the reef. Soldiers stationed there take shelter at BRP Sierra Madre, a Philippine naval ship that was purposely run aground in the reef shortly before the Philippines decided to occupy it. Together with Rizal Reef (Commodore Reef), Ayungin Reef can give the Philippines a sentry advantage in stopping other countries' occupation of features nearest to the Philippines (see map below).

China has also been reported seeking to establish another forward outpost, past Mischief Reef and closer to Palawan. Philippine Air Force planes have blasted the buoys out of the water.

China occupied only eight features. However, these features were strategic points in the area, making China able to assert its exploitation rights for the whole area. In contrast, the Philippines and Malaysia are limited to particular regions in the area, making these two countries incapable of contesting exploitation rights in other regions. In his essay contributed for TIME Asia in 1999, Professor Alex Magno of University of the Philippines pointed out that China is the main aggressor in the Spratly dispute. Magno, in particular, called on ASEAN to be watchful of China's actions in the South China Sea (Magno said it is very unlucky for ASEAN that the sea where the Spratly group lies is named South China Sea, named after China). Being one of the major consumers of Chinese goods and being adjacent to China itself, the ASEAN bloc is capable of crippling the Chinese economy, both through product boycotts and the possibility of peace instability. Even non-Spratly claiming ASEAN nations—Singapore, Indonesia, Laos, Cambodia, Thailand and Myanmar—are more supportive to the Vietnamese, Philippine, Malaysian and Bruneian claims than the Chinese claim. However, China today is beginning to engage itself in joint efforts to exploit the area. In particular, China, the Philippines, and Vietnam are already working on their second phase of drawing a joint exploitation plan.

In November 2002 the Declaration on the Conduct of Parties in the South China Sea was signed in an effort to ease tensions between the claimants. It has been described as stipulating "that all nations claiming sovereignty over the Spratly Islands shall commit to the status quo and shall not erect any new structure in the disputed regions of Spratly, Paracel Islands and Scarborough Shoal." The actual language of the declaration, however, mentions neither "status quo" nor the erection of structures.

JMSU controversy
The Joint Marine Seismic Undertaking (JMSU) is a tripartite agreement between the Philippines, China and Vietnam to conduct seismic exploration in an area spanning 142,886 square kilometers west of Palawan, all of which are within Philippine territories (as defined by EEZ of UNCLOS and does not necessarily mean as accepted by China and Vietnam). More specifically it is an agreement between Philippine National Oil Company -Exploration Corporation (PNOC-EC), China National Offshore Oil Corporation (CNOOC) and Vietnam Oil and Gas Corporation (PetroVietnam), that was signed in September 2004 and took effect in July 2005. JMSU has already finished the first phase of the seismic exploration which lasted from September 1 to November 16, 2006, covering 11,000 line kilometers. A Chinese vessel conducted the survey, Vietnam processed the data gathered and this was interpreted by PNOC-EC in Manila. The second phase started in October 2007, covering 11,800 line kilometers. It was supposedly to end January 2008.

A controversy broke out when Barry Wain, a researcher in the Institute for Southeast Asian Studies in Singapore, wrote an article in the January–February 2008 issue of the Hong-Kong-based Far Eastern Economic Review saying that "it was largely a sellout on the part of the Philippines". Wain wrote:The Philippines ... has made breathtaking concessions in agreeing to the area for study, including parts of its own continental shelf not even claimed by China and Vietnam.Regarding the area of exploration he stated:[The area] thrusts into the Spratlys and abuts Malampaya, a Philippine producing gas field. About one-sixth of the entire area, closest to the Philippine coastline, is outside the claims by China and Vietnam.

This prompted the Philippine Senate and House of Representatives (HR) to seek separate inquiries into the said agreement. Several senators alleged that "the agreement weakens the government's position in its claim over the disputed islands." Also, some alleged that it is a "precondition" set by China in exchange of some loan agreements. After signing the agreement, China has committed Philippines US$2 billion a year in loans. President Gloria Macapagal-Arroyo is suspected by some legislators to be hiding the facts about the agreement. Malacañang rebuts by saying that the agreement is not hidden and is actually posted in a government website. However, legislators are not convinced. They say Malacañang intentionally did not disseminate the right amount of information about the agreement including a detailed map which was only made available by Malacañang few days after the controversy broke out to a limited number of people. China denied the allegations connecting the deal with the loans.

Another puzzle some legislators pointed out is the continued delay in the passage of the bill setting the Philippines’ archipelagic baselines. The bill is needed to be passed before the middle of 2009 to beat the deadline set by the United Nations for the measures defining countries’ territorial claims. The bill has just passed its second reading and the third and final reading is not yet started. Furthermore, the HR committee on foreign affairs received a message from Department of Foreign Affairs (DFA) saying that the bill should not be passed because it is in conflict with some international agreements the government had entered to.

The Philippine Senate, which is an opposition-majority block, believes that the President can be impeached if she was proven to have forsaken the national interests of the Philippines. Charges can include treason, betrayal of public trust, violation of the constitution and other charges related to other anomalies the Arroyo is currently facing. The Philippine Senate believes that the agreement should have gone through them for ratification before it could take effect.

Opposition legislators also say that the agreement is a betrayal to the 10-member ASEAN. After ASEAN, as a group, confronted China 10 years ago regarding the latter's apparent of hegemonic motive in South China Sea, the legislators said that Philippines had made an agreement with China on its own without even consulting other ASEAN states. Vietnam is said to have initially resisted joining the agreement but was eventually "forced" to join to protect its own interest after Philippines gave China a 100% OK.

The alleged betrayal also extends up to the signing of the Code of Conduct in 2002. The legislators said that after convincing the other ASEAN states to force China sign the Declaration, which China initially resisted, the Philippines had made an agreement which will clearly affect the fates of other ASEAN states without even consulting them. The legislators also say that Arroyo became too soft regarding China's claim over the Spratlys, while all other ASEAN states are still strongly rejecting it.

Malacañang, on the other hand, continues to stress that there is nothing wrong with the agreement and that it doesn't go against the constitution. They contend that the agreement is for purely seismic activities only, without any actual exploitation activities, thus there is no need for a Senate ratification. Supporters of the agreement contend that the nature of the activity is a scientific one which helps in easing the tensions among the three involved nations. They also say that the JMSU is not different from other agreements the Philippines had made in the past with Australia and Norway regarding the oil in the Spratlys. Critics, on the other hand, pointed that Australia and Norway are in a different situation since neither of these countries is a claimant to the Spratlys.

Because of the controversy, some Philippine legislators were alarmed by the increasing Chinese influence in the Philippines which is in parallel with the growing influence of China in other countries, especially in Africa. Reports came out saying that the United States was "pissed off" by the Philippines’ deal with China, signifying a war of the US and China for dominance in the ASEAN region. The US embassy in Manila denied the reports.

Current Status
On 2018, the Philippine Coast Guard constructed 5 lighthouses in the area.

Around 2018–19, Philippines started to built a beach ramp, enabling the delivery of construction equipment for to work on the construction, rehabilitation and repairs of the Rancudo Airfield airstrip, soldiers' barracks, conventional and renewable power generators, desalination facilities, lighthouses, sewage disposal system, shelters and storage facilities for civilian fishermen.

By May 2020, the beaching ramp was completed and Filipino Naval ship BRP Ivatan landed on the ramp. Work on the port and upgrades to the island's airstrip progressed.

Activities and policies

Republic Act 9522

Republic Act 9522, was passed by the Congress which defined the archipelagic baselines of the Philippines, claimed sovereignty over the Kalayaan Island Group and the Scarborough Shoal under Section 2, sub-paragraph A which described the territory as a "Regime of Islands"—a concept defined in the United Nation Convention on Law of the Sea for similar bodies of land.

2016 PCA Tribunal ruling

In January 2013, the Philippines formally initiated arbitration proceedings against China's claim on the territories within the "nine-dash line" that includes Spratly Islands, which it said is "unlawful" under the United Nations Convention on the Law of the Sea (UNCLOS) convention. An arbitration tribunal was constituted under Annex VII of UNCLOS and it was decided in July 2013 that the Permanent Court of Arbitration (PCA) would function as registry and provide administrative duties in the proceedings.

On July 12, 2016, the arbitrators of the tribunal of PCA  agreed unanimiously with the Philippines. They concluded in the award that there was no evidence that China had historically exercised exclusive control over the waters or resources, hence there was "no legal basis for China to claim historic rights" over the nine-dash line. Accordingly, the PCA tribunal decision is ruled as final and non-appealable by either countries. The tribunal also criticized China's land reclamation projects and its construction of artificial islands in the Spratly Islands, saying that it had caused "severe harm to the coral reef environment". It also characterized Taiping Island and other features of the Spratly Islands as "rocks" under UNCLOS, and therefore are not entitled to a 200 nautical mile exclusive economic zone. China however rejected the ruling, calling it "ill-founded". Taiwan, which currently administers Taiping Island, the largest of the Spratly Islands, also rejected the ruling.

Guarding activity
The Philippines has stationed soldiers in its occupied islands and reefs. One to three small structures were built in Likas, Parola, Kota, Lawak and Rizal Reef to house soldiers. The only island with a significant number of structures is Pagasa (see Pagasa Island subsection in this article), the only Philippine-occupied island to have a civilian population. The Philippines has not built any structure on Ayungin and Balagtas Reefs. A Philippine Navy ship, BRP Sierra Madre, which ran aground on Ayungin Reef in 1999, serves as a shelter and observation post for soldiers stationed here. In Balagtas Reef, the Philippine Navy's ships take alternate shifts in guarding the reef and the whole area encompassing all other Philippine-occupied islands. The two other Philippine-occupied islands, Patag and Panata, are each less than a hectare in area. Fortunately for the Philippines, these two tiny islands are each near a large Philippine-occupied island. Patag Island is just  from Lawak Island and Panata Island is just  from Kota Island. Lawak and Kota are 7.93 and 6.45 hectares in area respectively. This situation enables the Philippines to guard the small islands effectively without having to build any structures, or to station soldiers permanently to the two tiny islands. A  watchtower is present on each of the large islands to effectively see the tiny islands within the horizon. In addition, Philippine Navy vessels and reconnaissance planes are always present in the area to monitor movements of foreign countries.

The Philippines in the Spratly group, like any other country, reserves the right to fire upon any vessel of other countries found within the horizon of its occupied features. For instance, the Smart Communications engineering team sent to install a communication system in Pagasa Island in 2005 was forced to seek temporary refuge in BRP Sierra Madre due to inclement weather. Since their boat did not display a Philippine flag, the marines stationed at BRP Sierra Madre considered sinking the boat. Fortunately for the engineering team, the marines did not carry out their plan as they suspected that the boat was crewed by Filipinos and that it was seeking refuge because of the storm.

A documentary produced by i-Witness of GMA 7, a local TV network, entitled Bantay ng Kalayaan (lit. Guards of Kalayaan), featured the lives of soldiers guarding the islands of Patag and Lawak Islands. As the two islands are near each other, they are managed as a single unit. In the documentary, four enlisted soldiers are stationed there. A simple wooden structure on Lawak, the larger of the two islands, serves as their shelter. They have two dogs as mascots. Basketball serves as a pastime to relieve boredom. Every month, a Navy vessel arrives on a supply run and to replace one or two soldiers. Their weapons include M16 rifles and a few grenades. The soldiers themselves believe that they will never be able to protect the islands if other countries attacked them. However, all of them agree that the islands should be guarded since it is of national importance. Occasionally, some Filipino fishermen who happen to see the islands, visit for a few minutes and engage the soldiers in conversation. These fishermen would commend the soldiers, a morale-booster. Before leaving, the fishermen would leave the soldiers a portion of their catch.

Among the claimant nations, the Philippines is considered the weakest in terms of military capability. Its defense program in the Spratlys only includes several old naval vessels, most of which are used assets sourced from the US military. Its air assets lean more toward surveillance types rather than fighters. A former Armed Forces chief of the Philippines, General Hermogenes Esperon Jr., expressed doubts that the Philippines can win a war with other claimants. However, he said that this will not hinder the Philippine's soldiers from defending the islands. "We may not have the chance, but that does not mean that soldiers are not willing to fight for the country," he said. He stated that despite limited firepower, Filipino troops are ready for "hand-to-hand" combat.

After the signing of the Code of Conduct between claimant nations in November 2002, the Philippines have maintained a total of 450 soldiers stationed in all of the features it occupies. About 40 of those are in Pagasa Island. The remainder are divided among the remaining features. These exclude the one to two policemen and several village guards or barangay tanods which are unarmed and are considered as civilians of Pagasa island. These also exclude naval personnel aboard Philippine Navy and Philippine Coast Guard vessels and pilots of the Philippine Air Force's jets which regularly patrol the area.

Balikatan exercises

The Balikatan Exercises have been part of Operation Enduring Freedom - Philippines (OEF-P) which is in turn part of Operation Enduring Freedom and the U.S. Global War on Terrorism.  Since 2001, United States and Philippines have held joint military exercises in different parts of the Philippines.  However, some analysts see this agreement as a move of the Philippines in its desperate quest to protect its claimed territories.Further reading on Rebuilding the U.S.-Philippine Alliance (The Heritage Foundation)  During the 1970s and 1980s, the Soviets who have bases in Vietnam and the United States which has bases in the Philippines have maintained a balance of power in the Spratly region. After the collapse of the USSR and the departure of United States forces from the Philippines in 1991, most claimants, especially China, have aggressively taken actions occupying features and building more structures. In 2001, two years after China's building of additional structures in Mischief Reef that caused a news panic in Manila, the Visiting Forces Agreement was ratified by both United States and the Philippines. Since then, a joint military exercise is always held annually.

Many of the war games involved amphibious assault exercises. Some of these amphibious assault exercises were held in Palawan which lies near the Spratlys. Analysts say Philippines does not need amphibious assault in jungle warfare with Philippines' secessionist groups. China has protested past Balikatan exercises that were held near the Spratlys.

The Philippines has invoked its mutual defense treaty with the US to obtain US assistance in repelling Chinese forces from islands claimed by the Philippines. Signed in 1951, the treaty stipulates the two countries to defend each other in case of an attack from an external party. However, US does not include the Spratly Islands in its understanding of Philippine territory. Instead, the US limited itself in continuously supporting the Philippine defense programs with military and intelligence aid and training, and a variety of diplomatic measures aimed at sending a "strong message" to Beijing. Such "strong messages" and the ASEAN intervention are believed to have calmed China's previously aggressive drive in the Spratly region.

Grounded ships
China has accused the Philippines of intentionally grounding two naval vessels in the Spratly group to advance an occupation. The two ships, the BRP Sierra Madre and BRP Benquet, were grounded on Ayungin (Second Thomas) Reef and Panatag (Scarborough) Shoal during 1999. The Philippines decided to occupy Ayungin Reef following Malaysia's sudden occupation of Erica Reef and Investigator Shoal during the same year.

China then urged the Philippines to remove the grounded ships and the Philippines immediately replied that it would do so. However, the Philippines only removed BRP Benquet from Scarborough Shoal shortly before the official visit of Chinese Premier Zhu Rongji to Manila. After the Philippines removed BRP Benguet she went aground again on Pagasa Island in 2004, but was removed again and still serves the Philippine Navy today.

Pag-asa Island

As of 2008, the only Philippine-occupied Spratly island to have many structures is Pagasa (Thitu) Island, the lone barangay of Municipality of Kalayaan, Palawan. All Philippine-occupied Spratly islands are integrated as one municipality to the province of Palawan. Cities and municipalities in the Philippines are divided into smaller political units called barangays. However, because Pagasa is currently the only civilian-inhabited island, Kalayaan is the only municipality in the Philippines to have a single barangay and that is Pagasa. Pagasa has about 300 civilian residents and 40 soldiers. The civilian population is always less than 200 at a time since other Kalayaan residents have businesses to attend to on the Palawan mainland. The population is regulated to protect the island's environment, to avoid short supplies of commodities and to conserve land space. Pagasa is only 37 hectares and can only accommodate a maximum of 500 people at a time. Most of the civilian population consists of poor Filipinos who were convinced by Mayor Mantes to settle in the islands since 2002. Before, Pagasa Island barely had a civilian population even though Kalayaan was already an established municipality. The settlers are provided a means of livelihood by the government. Most of them are involved in fishing and other sea-related crafts. To make some additions to their supplies which are provided by a naval ship which visits once a month, the settlers also raise pigs, goats and chickens and plant some crops in an allotted space.

Because of its thriving civilian community, the only one in the Spratly group, Pagasa has many structures compared to other Philippine-occupied islands. These include the municipal multi-purpose hall, a police station, a school and clinic, a military outpost, a water treatment plant, a deep well, a marina, a 1.26 km airstrip, a commercial communications tower, power generator, houses of civilian families, pig barns and goat and poultry houses. However, the number and size of Pagasa's structures are still relatively few and small compared to structures of other countries’ occupied islands. One unique feature of Pagasa Island is its  unconcretized airstrip. Aerial photos of Pagasa Island show that a rectangular portion of the coral base around Pagasa is reclaimed to serve as an extension of the airstrip. Pagasa's airstrip is the longest airstrip in the Spratly group, followed by Taiwan's Itu Aba (Ligao) Island's  airstrip (completed in January 2008), Malaysia's Swallow Reef's  airstrip and Vietnam's Spratly (proper) (Lagos) Island's  airstrip. Pagasa's airstrip can accommodate Philippine Air Force (PAF) fighter jets and even the huge C-130 cargo planes. Right now, numerous plans are proposed for Pagasa. One plan is construction of a hangar beside the airstrip to house more surveillance and fighter jets of the PAF. Another plan is to concretize the airstrip to avoid rough landings of planes.

For the Philippine Navy, they are proposing making a causeway that leads all the way to a deep water region where naval vessels can dock. Pagasa island is completely surrounded by its wide coral base making it hard for naval vessels to get near the island. Actually, one naval vessel, the BRP Benguet, attempted to dock near the island in 2004 but it was damaged and went aground. Up to this day, the damaged ship is still there. The Philippine government currently has no resources to move the damaged ship. And in 2001, civilian Filipinos who first settled on the island had needed to make numerous boat trips between the coast and the ship to move their belongings and properties. The pigs they have carried to the island were actually thrown in the water. The pigs float in water and they instinctively swim to the nearest land they can see.

Kalayaan residents have also erected an imposing bust of Tomas Cloma on the island as a tribute to Kalayaan's founder.

The Kalayaan residents (led by their mayor) are proposing to have the island developed for tourism. The island has a white beach; trees and birds are abundant. It has good diving spots too. An AFP military chief said that the army together with its navy would help bring more tourists to the white sands and pristine waters of Pagasa Island starting April 2008. In addition, there have been plans of building stilt cottages in Pagasa Island, like the ones in El Nido and Puerto Princesa in Palawan. Several housing units were already built to accommodate tourists. One to two commercial flights between Pagasa and Puerto Princesa City are available weekly for tourists.

On June 9, 2020, the Department of National Defense led the inauguration of a beaching ramp on Pag-asa Island (Thitu) which was finally completed after three years. The facility enabled to bring in more materials and equipment to repair and maintain the airstrip and building of other facilities. Also, Department of Transportation (DOTR) confirmed that the new seaport and sheltered port in the Thithu island is completed and ready to operate by June 12.

, the Philippine Coast Guard plans to upgrade its coast guard station Kalayaan on the island to boost monitoring of incursions and maritime safety and search and rescue.

On June 12, 2021, The National Power Corporation switched on its P33 million Kalayaan Diesel Power Plant project that covered the supply, delivery and installation of the 300 kilowatt diesel generating sets, a 13.8-kilovolt (kV) distribution line and fuel oil storage tanks, providing round-the-clock power to the  facilities on the island.

Other islands and reefs
Parola, Likas, Kota and Lawak Islands are expected to be populated within the following next two decades. However, the latter two islands may take a longer time to be populated because they are less than eight hectares, requiring a need for land reclamation to expand their areas. This will make the Municipality of Kalayaan to have a total of five barangays. On the other hand, Patag and Panata Islands are too small to be populated. They are most likely to remain as military outposts unless the Philippines opt to do some massive land reclamation projects on the islands. Rizal, Balagtas and Ayungin Reefs will likely remain as fishing zones occupied by Philippine forces. Land reclamation on these reefs, like what Malaysia did to Swallow Reef where Malaysia turned it into an artificial island with 6.2 hectares area, will reduce the Philippines' fishing space. Thus, such reclamation projects might be opposed by Filipino fishermen who regularly fish in the said reefs.

A proposal to build lighthouses in some shallow features to the east of the 116°E meridian like Iroquois Reef and Sabina Shoal is also being considered.

Filipino soldiers guarding the islands always feel bored in their assignment. Their niche is very small. There is very little to do in the islands. Though all features of the Philippines have a satellite dish to provide soldiers access to television shows, and a satellite telephone for them to have continuous contact with their family and superiors, these have not been enough to lift their boredom.

The soldiers in Lawak Island, just to signify how bored they were, said that they enjoy watching the flights, egg-laying and incubation of the numerous sea gulls living on the island.

The soldiers on Rizal Reef, on the other hand, enjoy fishing. Rizal Reef has white sandbars which are above water level when the tide is not extremely high. These sandbars enclose many lagoons which according to the soldiers are like "swimming pools" for the clear water they enclose. When the weather is bad (e.g., typhoon), there comes the boredom. They have no choice but to stay inside their small quarters on stilts. However, they are not totally bitter when the weather is bad since it is also their source of clean water. The roof of their quarters is made such that it can catch raindrops and stock them in a huge container. The soldiers said that, unlike food which can be provided by their fishing and a vegetable garden beside their barracks, fresh water is their number one concern. When they run out of fresh water supplied by the Philippine Navy or Coast Guard, they begin drinking the water caught from the rain. And during these times is when they limit their baths as much as they can.

Soldiers on Ayungin Reef have similar problems regarding clean water. However, unlike the soldiers in Rizal Reef who have small quarters, the soldiers in Ayungin Reef have a much better lifestyle. Their shelter is the grounded BRP Sierra Madre, a Philippine naval vessel. They have individual beds, a karaoke machine, and a dining area.

The Philippine Marines in Panata Island, on the other hand, used to raise up to five sharks at a time in a lagoon located in the middle of the island.

The Philippine government tries to compensate for this boredom by giving the soldiers a salary way above their normal salary. Actually, this has been the reason why some of the soldiers always volunteer to take the job despite the boredom.

Oil exploration

The area surrounding Spratly is said    to be rich in yet unexplored oil and gas fields, and hence, remains controversial.

The Philippines began exploring the areas west of Palawan for oil in 1970. Exploration in the area began in Reed Bank/Tablemount (Reed Bank is the largest seamount within the Spratly Islands) in 1976, gas was discovered following the drilling of a well. However, China's complaints halted the exploration.

Today, Malampaya oil platform is the only operational oil platform in the Philippines. It is not claimed by other countries. It contains  of natural gas reserves. The Malapaya Project began the Philippines' natural gas industry and enabled the supply of at least 2,700 megawatts of power for a period of at least 20 years starting 2002. It is also believed to be the deepest horizontal subsea well test undertaken in the world at a depth of about 850 m.

The upstream component of the US$4.5 billion Malampaya gas-to-power project was jointly developed by Shell Philippines Exploration B.V. (SPEX), ChevronTexaco and PNOC EC. The project was formally inaugurated on October 16, 2001. Shell Philippines Exploration owns 45% of the project, ChevronTexaco owns 45% and PNOC-EC owns 10%. Malampaya is expected to provide substantial long-term revenue of between $8–10 billion USD to the Philippine government over its life span. Other sites eyed by PNOC-EC west of Palawan are the Calamian, West Calamian, West Balabac, and East Sabina sites.

Another oil field being explored today is Reed Bank, which exploration was halted in 1980's after China's objections. The concession is currently awarded to Forum Energy plc, a UK-based oil, gas and coal company. The Reed Bank concession is located in the South China Sea west of Palawan Island. The licence is located to the southwest of the Shell-operated Malampaya Gas Field.

The concession was first awarded to Sterling Energy plc (which later merged with another company to form Forum Energy) in June 2002. In 2003 Sterling reprocessed 250 km of 2D seismic data and completed a feasibility study on the gas-to-liquid options for the gas field. The seismic work and the gas-to-liquid study fulfilled the initial work commitments on the concession and Sterling was granted a 12-month extension in June 2004. In 2005 Forum acquired new 3D seismic data over the licence area fulfilling its work commitments required under the 12-month extension.

Unlike Malampaya, Reed Bank is claimed by the People's Republic of China, Republic of China, and Vietnam. There is still no news on whether these countries are disputing this exploration or not. In March 2011, two Chinese vessels chased off the Veritas Voyager, a survey ship hired by Forum Energy—a UK-based company with a portfolio of projects in the Philippines. Forum Energy intends to return to Reed Bank in 2012 to explore for energy resources. The U.S. military has also signalled its return to the area, with war games scheduled in March with the Philippine navy near Reed Bank.

Fisheries enforcement

Arrests of Chinese fishermen
Many Chinese vessels fish in the South China Sea. Some of these enter internal Philippine waters like the Sulu Sea, and not just disputed waters in the Spratly islands. The Philippines, in general, is tolerant in allowing Chinese vessels to fish in disputed areas including Scarborough Shoal and waters in the vicinity of Philippine-occupied Spratly islands. They are, however, arrested if the Philippine Navy or Coast Guard determines that they are doing illegal fishing activity (i.e., using dynamites, or cyanide poison).

The Philippines is less tolerant in waters east of the 116°E meridian, the Sulu Sea and the waters between Philippine islands (non-Spratly). Within these areas Chinese fishing vessels normally fly a Philippine flag to avoid suspicion, or try to escape into Malaysian or Indonesian waters when hailed to elude arrest. When caught the fishermen are usually charged with trespassing in Philippine territories.

The press in the Philippines regularly reports arrests of these fishermen, with violations ranging from failure to allow Philippine authorities to inspect their ships when inside Philippine waters, to using illegal fishing methods (dynamite, trawl net, or using cyanide poison), to fishing in marine reserves, or more commonly, poaching of endangered sea species like sea turtles. These fishermen are usually labeled as "Chinese poachers" by the Philippine press. Most of them are arrested in the Sulu Sea (an internal sea within the Philippines), with some apprehended in Scarborough Shoal. Rarely, arrests are made in the Visayas seas.

When poachers are arrested in the Spratly region, they are turned in to Puerto Princesa City, Palawan; if in the Sulu Sea, to Puerto Princesa City, Palawan or Zamboanga City whichever is nearer; if in Scarborough Shoal, to Subic, Zambales.

Apprehended poachers are put to trial quickly, to avoid further political disputes with China. Normally cases are disposed of within two months, with almost all being convictions. However, Philippine courts generally only confiscate the vessels, and fines the offenders a sum of money that is always paid by the Chinese government.

In other situations, the courts approve bail even before a trial could start, and the fishermen are repatriated. Environmentalists in the Philippines have always criticized the Philippine government for allowing Chinese fishermen to be released on bail, saying that they must still be punished under Philippine laws. China has always protested the Philippines' arrest of its fishermen, whether these were arrested in the Spratly region controlled by the Philippines, in Scarborough Shoal, or in the internal Sulu Sea.

Arrests of Vietnamese fishermen
There had been occasions of arrests of Vietnamese fishermen by the Philippine Navy and Coast Guard, however these are not as frequent as arrests of Chinese fishermen. The arrests are also caused largely by poaching activities. The latest arrest of Vietnamese fishermen happened in May 2014 in the province of Zambales.No comprehensive discussion about arrests of Vietnamese fishermen is easily available. A web search can provide ample sources about these arrests.

Map showing possessions

See also

 Kalayaan, Palawan
 Spratly Islands dispute
 Territorial disputes in the South China Sea

 References 

Further reading
 Inquirer.net Special Report on the Spratly Issue
 Dzurek, Daniel J. and Clive H.Schofield. The Spratly Islands dispute: who's on first?''. IBRU; 1996.

External links
 Google Maps of Spratly Islands

History of the Spratly Islands
History of the Philippines